Kira may refer to:

People
 Kira clan, a Japanese clan, descended from Emperor Seiwa (850–880)
 Kira (given name), including a list of people with the given name
 Kira Chikazane (1563–1588), Japanese retainer
 Kira (German singer) (Janine Scholz, born 1978)
 Kira (Belgian singer) (Natasja de Witte, born 1977)
 Kira, uploader of pictures in the Edison Chen photo scandal, named after the Death Note character
 Matúš Kira, Slovak football goalkeeper

Fictional characters
 Kira (given name), including a list of fictional characters with the given name
 Izuru Kira, in the manga and anime series Bleach
 Kira Nerys, in the television Star Trek: Deep Space Nine
 Kira Yoshikage, in the manga and anime series JoJo's Bizarre Adventure
 Sakuya Kira, in the manga series Angel Sanctuary
 Tsubasa Kira, in the anime television series Love Live!
 Kira, an alias of Light Yagami in the manga and anime series Death Note

Places
 Kira, Aichi, Japan
 Kirən or Kira, Azerbaijan
 Kira, Burkina Faso
 Kira Rural LLG, Papua New Guinea
 Kira Town, Uganda
 Kira (crater), on the far side of the Moon

Other uses
 Kira (Bhutan), the national dress for women in Bhutan
 Kira (title), for women who acted on behalf of the Imperial Harem of the Ottoman Empire
 Kira Institute, a non-profit organization

See also

 Kira Kira (disambiguation)
 Keira (disambiguation)
 Kiera, a given name
 Kirra (disambiguation)
 Kyra (disambiguation)
 Ciara (given name)